Donald Peter McInnes (December 19, 1933 – August 10, 2015) was a Canadian dairy farmer and political figure in Nova Scotia. He represented Pictou West in the Nova Scotia House of Assembly from 1978 to 1998 as a Progressive Conservative member.

Early life
McInnes was born in 1933 at Pictou, Nova Scotia and educated at the Pictou Academy and the Nova Scotia Agricultural College. He married Jennie MacDonald in 1956.

Before politics
McInnes was the president of the Nova Scotia Holstein Association and the Nova Scotia Milk & Cream Producers. McInnes was also a director and manager for the Pictou County Farmer's Mutual Fire Insurance Company. In 2002, McInnes was inducted into the Atlantic Agricultural Hall of Fame.

Political career
McInnes entered provincial politics in 1978, defeating Liberal cabinet minister Dan Reid by 153 votes in the Pictou West riding. He was re-elected in the 1981, and 1984 elections. In April 1988, McInnes was appointed to the Executive Council of Nova Scotia as Minister of the Environment. He was re-elected in the 1988 election, and was moved to Minister of Fisheries in a post-election cabinet shuffle. When Donald Cameron took over as premier in February 1991, McInnes served as Minister of Transportation and Communications, and later as Minister of Agriculture and Marketing. In the 1993 election, the Progressive Conservatives were reduced to nine seats, losing government to the Liberals, however in Pictou West, McInnes was re-elected by almost 700 votes. McInnes did not reoffer in the 1998 election.

McInnes died in New Glasgow on August 10, 2015 at the age of 81.

References 
 Entry from Canadian Who's Who

1933 births
2015 deaths
Progressive Conservative Association of Nova Scotia MLAs
Nova Scotia Agricultural College alumni
Members of the Executive Council of Nova Scotia
People from Pictou County